Stanley Richieri Afonso or simply Stanley (born August 10, 1985 in Sertanópolis-PR), is a Brazilian left back. He currently plays for Betim.

Honours
Japanese League: 2000
Paraná State League: 2002, 2005
Dallas Cup: 2004, 2005

Contract
1 February 2008 to 27 May 2008

External links
 sambafoot
 rubronegro
 CBF
 atleticopr
 globoesporte
 pstc
 zerozero

1985 births
Living people
Brazilian footballers
Tokyo Verdy players
Guarani FC players
Club Athletico Paranaense players
Associação Ferroviária de Esportes players
Esporte Clube São Bento players
Associação Atlética Caldense players
Rio Branco Sport Club players
Ipatinga Futebol Clube players
Águia de Marabá Futebol Clube players

Association football defenders